George Augustus Oliver Conquest (1837 – 14 May 1901) was a playwright, theatrical manager, acrobat and pantomimist described as "the most stunning actor-acrobat of his time".

Early life and family 
Conquest was born in 1837, the son of theatrical manager Benjamin Conquest (c. 1804 – 12 July 1872). He was educated in France. He had three sons who were also active in the theatre, George Conquest (1858–1926), Fred Conquest (1871–1941) and Arthur Conquest (1875–1945).

Career 

In 1851, Benjamin Conquest acquired the Grecian Theatre and Eagle Tavern in the City Road, Hackney, London. The theatre had previously produced light opera and was originally a music hall, but Conquest senior switched to Shakespeare which was unsuccessful. He then tried melodrama which was more popular and he produced over 100 such shows written by George, often adapted from French productions. George was also an acrobat and pantomimist and produced and appeared in nearly 50 pantomimes with Henry Spry.

George helped to run the Grecian and inherited it on his father's death. The theatre was rebuilt in 1858, again in 1876, and sold in around 1878 or 1879 when George Conquest went on a tour of the United States. He was injured in a stage accident during the tour. He returned to England and took over the Surrey Theatre in Lambeth in 1881, staging melodramas and pantomimes as he had at the Grecian. The last production in which he appeared was Sinbad and the Little Old Man of the Sea &c. with Dan Leno and wife in 1897. His son George took over the theatre on his father's death.

Death 
Conquest died on 14 May 1901.

Selected works with Henry Spry 
Spitz-Spitz the Spider Crab; or The Pirate of Spitsbergen. Grecian Theatre, 1875.
Jack and the Beanstalk, which grew to the moon; or, the Giant, Jack Frost and the Ha-Ha Balloon. Surrey Theatre, 1886. Starring Dan Leno and wife.
Sinbad and the Little Old Man of the Sea; or, The Tinker, the Tailor, the Soldier, the Sailor, Apothecary, Ploughboy, Gentleman Thief. Surrey Theatre, 1887. Starring Dan Leno and wife.

References 

1837 births
1901 deaths